Paul Marny (1829–1914) was a noted British–French artist.

Life
Marny was born in Paris; his real name may have been Paul François or Charles Paul Goddard.  He worked in the theatre, and as a porcelain decorator for the Sèvres factory, before moving to Belfast to work with a French architect. In 1860 he moved to Scarborough, at the suggestion of Oliver Sarony, the photographic pioneer and brother of Napoleon Sarony. There he taught Albert Strange and other Scarborough artists. William Tindall was his brother-in-law.

Marny exhibited at the Royal Academy. In 1874 the British Journal of Photography reported that

'A Gallic brother, M. Paul Marny Godard, of Paris, has obtained a patent for the application of carbon printing to porcelain or other similar substance, which, after the picture is developed, receives a coating of transparent enamel ...".

He died in Scarborough.

Works
Marny was a watercolour and landscape artist, and a lithographer. He exhibited at the Paris Salon in 1857. He is known for his painting The Loss of the Scarborough Lifeboat, which occurred on 2 November 1861, a subject also painted by Henry Redmore, Ernest Roe and J. N. Carte. His work is in galleries in Birkenhead, Lincoln, Scarborough and Whitby.

His painting Scarborough from White Nabb, which is in Scarborough Art Gallery inspired Andrew Cheetham's North Bay.

Notes

External links
His monogram (an 'M' split into two parts) is shown here.
 See images here and here

1829 births
1914 deaths
19th-century French painters
French male painters
20th-century French painters
20th-century French male artists
Ceramics decorators
French emigrants to the United Kingdom
Painters from Paris
People from Scarborough, North Yorkshire
Artists from Yorkshire
19th-century French male artists